Victoria Spartz ( Kulheyko; ; born October 6, 1978) is an American politician and businesswoman who is the U.S. representative for . A member of the Republican Party, she previously represented the 20th district in the Indiana Senate.

Early life and education 
Victoria Kulheyko was born in Nosivka, Chernihiv Oblast, Ukraine, which at the time was part of the USSR. Before moving to the U.S., she earned a Bachelor of Science degree and a Master of Business Administration degree from the Kyiv National Economic University.

Spartz immigrated to the United States in 2000 at the age of 22 and became a U.S. citizen in 2006. She earned a Master of Accountancy from the Kelley School of Business of Indiana University – Purdue University Indianapolis.

Early career 
Spartz held a certified public accountant license from 2010 to 2021 and a real estate broker license from 2003 to 2020, both from the State of Indiana.

Spartz was a founding member of the Hamilton County, Indiana Tea Party. She served as CFO in the Indiana Attorney General's office before her appointment to the Indiana Senate. She was also an adjunct faculty member at the Kelley School of Business in Indianapolis and has owned real estate and farming businesses.

In 2017, Spartz was appointed to the Indiana Senate from the 20th district after Luke Kenley resigned.

U.S. House of Representatives

Elections

2020 

After incumbent Republican Susan Brooks announced in June 2019 that she would not seek reelection, Spartz announced her candidacy for Indiana's 5th congressional district. She won the Republican primary on June 2, 2020. The district had historically been a bastion of suburban conservatism, but had been heavily targeted by Democrats in the wake of Brooks's retirement and Donald Trump's growing unpopularity in suburban areas. The Cook Political Report rated the race a toss-up.

Spartz won the November general election, defeating former state representative Christina Hale, the Democratic nominee, by four percent. This was the closest race in the district since it was reconfigured as a northern suburban district in 1983 (it had been numbered the 6th until 2003), and only the second time in that period that a Democrat had received at least 40% of the vote. Spartz prevailed by winning her home county of Hamilton, the most populous county entirely within the district, by 20,100 votes, more than her district-wide margin of just under 17,000 votes. She ran just behind Trump, who won the district with 50.1% of the vote.

2022 

The 2021 Indiana redistricting rendered the 5th significantly more Republican than its predecessor. Notably, the district lost its share of Indianapolis. To make up for the loss in population, the 5th was pushed to the east to take in Muncie and Anderson, previously in the 6th district. Had the district existed in 2020, Spartz would have defeated Hale by 16 points.

After running unopposed in the primary, Spartz defeated Democratic nominee Jeanine Lee Lake in the general election.

Tenure
Spartz is the first Ukrainian-born female member of Congress and the first member born in a former Soviet republic. Members of Congress who were born in the then Soviet Union include Meyer London, Samuel Dickstein, Herman Kopplemann, and Herman Toll.

In late 2020, Spartz was identified as a participant in the Freedom Force, a group of incoming Republican members of the House of Representatives who "say they're fighting against socialism in America".

Spartz's tenure has been marked by high staff turnover. Congressional watchdog Legistorm measured her turnover in 2021 at three and half times the average of offices of House members, the highest turnover for a non-retiring member. In May 2022, Politico reported on a toxic environment within her office, with Spartz's temper quickly jumping from tepid to boiling, and reported that "aides who have left after a couple of months did so because the work environment became untenable." Examples of the office environment included Spartz ordering staff to record her direction to staff and later denying the previously expressed instructions, despite the recordings. One former aide said, "the common theme: Staffers do their job, and then Victoria comes in saying that they have no idea what they’re doing, that they are 'morons,' calling them 'idiots.'" Spartz responded that her working style is "not for everyone" and that her critics "need to 'toughen up'".

In September 2022, Politico reported that Spartz is planning to run for the United States Senate in 2024; incumbent Senator Mike Braun is running for governor of Indiana that year, leaving the seat open.

In January 2023, during the 2023 Speaker of the United States House of Representatives election, Spartz declined to vote for party nominee Kevin McCarthy on ballots four through 11, instead voting "present". She voted for McCarthy on the first three ballots and on the 12th through 15th ballots.

There were rumors that Spartz might run in Indiana's U.S. Senate election in 2024 after Mike Braun decided not to seek reelection, but on February 3, 2023, she announced that she would not run for reelection or any other office in 2024.

2022 Russian invasion of Ukraine

Spartz called the 2022 Russian invasion of Ukraine "a genocide of the Ukrainian people by a crazy man." Spartz was one of the first US officials to call Russian actions "war crimes." At the time of the invasion, Spartz had family still living in Ukraine, including her grandmother, who was living in Chernihiv, which was under siege by Russia.

During the ongoing invasion, Spartz traveled to Ukraine twice in April 2022. The first time was an unannounced visit to Bucha with U.S. Senator Steve Daines. Spartz and Daines were the first two U.S officials to visit Ukraine since the war started. The second trip was to Lviv, Kyiv, and Odesa with Representative Tim Walberg. During the trip, Spartz met with Metropolitan Epifaniy. Spartz has been critical of the speed and effectiveness of international humanitarian aid efforts.

In July 2022, Spartz criticized Ukrainian president Volodymyr Zelenskyy, accusing him of "playing politics and theater" and not governing seriously. In an interview with Ukrainian press, she accused the country's leaders of not preparing for war and not understanding the war's importance. She alleged that weapons sent to Ukraine may have ended up in Syria or Russia. She asserts that there is insufficient monitoring of U.S.-provided weaponry, and that Congress needs to take control in this area.

Also in July, Spartz enumerated six allegations of misbehavior against Andrii Yermak, a top official in Ukraine's government. Spartz asked the White House to investigate the allegations and report to a Congressional oversight committee. Among the allegations are that Yermak leaked war information to Russia, in several specific ways delayed or damaged Ukraine's military war efforts, and through his deputy Oleg Tatarov delayed the appointment of an anti-corruption prosecutor. Yermak had earlier been accused in a scandal alleging selling government jobs, and Tatarov's qualification to serve in a government capacity was in question. 

The Foreign Ministry of Ukraine responded that Spartz's allegations were "baseless speculation." Former U.S. ambassador to Russia Michael McFaul, who has been working with Yermak on sanctions policy, said that Yermak has been strongly anti-Russia and has proposed creative and novel sanctions. Some Republican representatives and senators disagreed with Spartz's accusations. Senator Lindsey Graham said "I don't share her criticisms" and "I believe that the Zelenskyy government and the Ukrainian people have risen to the moment. It is in our national security interest to stand with the Ukrainian people and their elected leadership." Some Republicans also believe the accusations could hurt the war effort and damage U.S. relations with Ukraine, while boosting GOP elements who opposed aid to Ukraine.

Political positions

Health policy 
In 2021, Spartz was chosen to serve on the House Republican Caucus's Affordability Subcommittee of Health Care Task Force. In 2022, she released "a slate of bills aimed at cracking down on health care costs" through curbing anti-competitive conduct in the healthcare industry.

Spartz has introduced legislation to empower the Federal Trade Commission (FTC) to rein in hospital mergers. In December 2022, she and Representative Pramila Jayapal introduced the Stop Anticompetitive Healthcare Act. In an op-ed for The Hill, Spartz argued that hospital monopolies are harming healthcare.

Socialism 
Spartz, who was born in Ukraine during the Soviet period, has criticized what she considers to be a resurgence in popularity for socialism in the United States. According to The Indianapolis Star, her upbringing "at least in part formed her belief that government involvement is inherently bad and ineffective and should only be used as a tool to incentivize society's betterment."

Committee assignments
 Committee on Education and Labor
 Committee on the Judiciary

Caucus membership 

 Republican Study Committee
 Congressional Ukrainian Caucus
 House Baltic Caucus
 Bulgaria Caucus
 French Caucus
 German-American Caucus
 Caucus on Hellenic Issues
 Slovak Caucus
 Caucus on Poland
 United Kingdom Caucus

Personal life 
While Spartz was in college, she met her future husband, Jason Spartz, on a train in Europe. They married in 2000. They have two daughters and live in Noblesville, Indiana. Jason is a Noblesville native whose father met his mother, a German citizen, while he was stationed in Germany after World War II. Spartz is Eastern Orthodox.

See also
Women in the United States House of Representatives

References

External links
Representative Victoria Spartz official U.S. House website
 Campaign website
 Indiana Senate page
 
 

|-

|-

1978 births
21st-century American politicians
21st-century American women politicians
Female members of the United States House of Representatives
Republican Party Indiana state senators
Kelley School of Business alumni
Kyiv National Economic University alumni
Living people
People from Noblesville, Indiana
People from Chernihiv Oblast
People with acquired American citizenship
Ukrainian emigrants to the United States
Women state legislators in Indiana
Republican Party members of the United States House of Representatives from Indiana
American politicians of Ukrainian descent
Eastern Orthodox Christians from Indiana
Eastern Orthodox Christians from the United States